Hyalurga sixola is a moth of the family Erebidae. It was described by William Schaus in 1910. It is found in Ecuador, French Guiana, Guatemala, Costa Rica and Mexico.

References

Hyalurga
Moths described in 1910